Service for Ladies is a lost 1927 American comedy silent film directed by Harry d'Abbadie d'Arrast and written by Benjamin Glazer, George Marion Jr., Chandler Sprague and Ernest Vajda. Starring Adolphe Menjou, Kathryn Carver, Charles Lane, Lawrence Grant, André Cheron, James A. Marcus and Nicholas Soussanin, it was released on April 6, 1927, by Paramount Pictures.

It was remade in 1932, directed by Alexander Korda and starring Leslie Howard and Elizabeth Allan.

Cast 
Adolphe Menjou as Albert Leroux
Kathryn Carver as Elizabeth Foster
Charles Lane as Robert Foster (*Charles Willis Lane)
Lawrence Grant as King Boris
André Cheron as Rajah
James A. Marcus as The head
Nicholas Soussanin	as Waiter with heart ache

References

External links 
 
 

1927 films
1920s English-language films
Silent American comedy films
1927 comedy films
Paramount Pictures films
American black-and-white films
Films set in hotels
Films set in restaurants
Lost American films
American silent feature films
1927 lost films
Lost comedy films
Films directed by Harry d'Abbadie d'Arrast
1920s American films